99¢ is the third studio album by American musician and singer Santigold, released on February 26, 2016 on Atlantic Records.

Release
On November 4, 2015, Santigold announced the release of her third studio album 99¢, originally scheduled for release on January 22, 2016. The announcement was accompanied by the release of the lead single, "Can't Get Enough of Myself", which premiered on Zane Lowe's Beats 1 show. On November 25, Santigold shared "Who Be Lovin' Me" alongside a music video. On December 16, it was announced that the release date of the album was delayed to February 26. On January 14, "Chasing Shadows" was released as the third single after premiering on Annie Mac's BBC Radio 1 show, with a music video being released the following day. The fourth and final single, "Banshee", was released on February 11.

Critical reception

At Metacritic, which assigns a normalized rating out of 100 to reviews from mainstream critics, the album received an average score of 71, based on 26 reviews, which indicates "generally favorable reviews". Stephen F. Kearse of Paste wrote, "Although the bulk of the album oscillates between sarcasm and sincerity, the most fully realized songs transcend that spectrum entirely." Drowned in Sounds Lee Adcock gave the album a favorable review, stating, "99¢ doesn't exactly deliver the discussion on commodity and the self promised on the cover, but Santigold have assembled a fine package, one which showcases White and her undeniable swagger."

Ryan McNutt of Exclaim! was more critical of the album, stating, "99¢ is an album buoyed by its sonic playfulness, but which fails to shake its playlist sensibility--entertaining, engaging but only occasionally leaving a lasting impression." Jonathan Wroble of Slant Magazine also criticized the album, stating, "More often than hitting a sweet spot in between, the songs here are overly busy (like "Big Boss") or short on ideas (the by-the-numbers "Before the Fire" and the psych-rock "Outside the War"), and the album's title turns into an unfortunate allusion to a warehouse stocked to the brim with cheap toys, none built to last."

Track listing

Notes
  signifies a co-producer
  signifies an additional producer

Personnel
Credits adapted from the liner notes of 99¢.

Musicians

 Santigold – vocals, guitar , synthesizer , instruments 
 B.C. – featured artist 
 ILoveMakonnen – featured artist 
 John Hill – guitar , keyboards , synthesizer , instruments 
 Patrik Berger – instruments 
 Martin Perna – flute , baritone saxophone , tenor saxophone 
 Jordan McLean – trumpet , flugelhorn 
 Rostam Batmanglij – keyboards , synthesizer 
 Mikey Hart – guitar , keyboards 
 Linus "Style of Eye" Eklow – instruments 
 Martin Stilling – instruments 
 James King – tenor Saxophone , baritone Saxophone 
 Fabio Santana – trombone 
 Todd Simon – trumpet 
 Noah Lev Beresin – synthesizer 
 Ian Longwell – drums , synthesizer 
 Doc McKinney – guitar 
 Nick Zinner – guitar , synthesizer 
 Sam Spiegel – synthesizer 
 Justin L. Raisen – bass , guitar , synthesizer 
 Bosh Rothman – drums 
 Alexandra Shungudzo – backing vocals 
 Amanda Warner – backing vocals 
 Cathy Dennis – backing vocals 
 Charli XCX – backing vocals 
 Noonie Bao – backing vocals 
 Sarah Hudson – backing vocals 
 Angel Deradoorian – backing vocals 
 Sam Dew – backing vocals 

Production

 Santigold – executive production, production 
 John Hill – production , additional production 
 Patrik Berger – production 
 Rostam Batmanglij – production , co-production , additional production 
 Linus "Style of Eye" Eklow – additional production 
 Martin Stilling – production 
 Ian Longwell – production 
 Justin L. Raisen – production 
 HazeBanga – production 
 Stint – production 
 Zeds Dead – production 
 David Andrew Sitek – production 
 Noah Breakfast – co-production , additional production 
 Nugget – additional production 
 Hit-Boy – additional production 
 VERYRVRE – additional production 
 Mike of Uzi – additional production 

Technical

 Santigold – programming 
 John Hill – programming 
 Patrik Berger – programming 
 Rostam Batmanglij – programming , mixing 
 Linus "Style of Eye" Eklow – programming 
 Nugget – programming 
 Martin Stilling – programming 
 Ajay Bhattacharya – programming 
 Ian Longwell – engineering 
 Justin L. Raisen – programming , additional mixing 
 Barbara Klaskin Silberg – choir directing 
 Nick Rowe – editing 
 Brendan Morawski – engineering , additional mixing 
 Ryan Gilligan – engineering 
 Dan Fyfe – engineering 
 Mark Rankin – engineering 
 Rob Cohen – engineering 
 Jimmy Gonzalez – engineering 
 John DeBold – engineering 
 Zeph Sowers – engineering 
 Nicolas Fournier – engineering assistance
 Martin Cooke – engineering assistance
 Danny Goliger – engineering assistance 
 Ebonie Smith – engineering assistance 
 Josh Wilson – engineering assistance 
 Will van Boldrik – engineering assistance 
 Miles Comaskey – mix engineering assistance 
 Rich Costey – mixing , additional mixing 
 Tony Maserati – mixing 
 Mario Borgatta – mixing assistance
 Claudio Cueni – additional mixing 
 Chris Gehringer – mastering

West Los Angeles Children's Choir 

 Dino Barranco
 Jack Thompson
 Jair Miles
 Mason Lee
 Matthew Goodman
 Michael Yang
 Misha Reiss
 Spencer Lee
 Taaryn Cooper
 Theo King

Artwork

 Santigold – art direction, design
 Matt Meiners – art direction, design
 Mark Jacobs – art direction, creative direction
 Photographer Hal – cover art
 Avena Gallagher – styling
 April Roomet – personal stylist
 Devra Kinnery – makeup
 YUSEF – hair
 Ron Bellair – hair assistant

Charts

References

2016 albums
Atlantic Records albums
Santigold albums